For the Super NES enhancement chip see List of Super NES enhancement chips

DSP-4, or N-(2-chloroethyl)-N-ethyl-2-bromobenzylamine, is a neurotoxin selective for noradrenergic neurons, capable of crossing the blood–brain barrier.

It exerts transient effects in peripheral sympathetic neurons, but more permanent changes within neurons of the central nervous system. It can induce long-term depletion in cortical and spinal levels of noradrenaline.

See also 
 5,7-Dihydroxytryptamine
 MPTP
 Oxidopamine

References 

Neurotoxins
Bromoarenes
Organochlorides
Amines
Nitrogen mustards
Chloroethyl compounds